Holy Smoke is the debut album from New Zealand pop singer Gin Wigmore, released under the mononym Gin. Singles released off the album included "Oh My", "I Do" and "Hey Ho". The Cardinals play on every track and backed Wigmore on her subsequent tour.

The album debuted at number one in New Zealand, and was certified Gold in its first week. The album was certified Platinum in its second week, selling over 15,000 copies. In September 2011, Home Improvement Retailer Lowe's began a new brand campaign featuring Wigmore's single "Don't Stop".

Commercial performance
Holy Smoke debuted at number one on the New Zealand Albums Chart, then slowly fell down the chart, before topping the chart again in February 2010. It then regained the top spot in October 2010 due to the release of the Deluxe Edition. It then soon gained Quadruple Platinum status.

Track listing

Charts

Certifications

Release history

See also
 List of number-one albums in 2010 (New Zealand)

References

2009 albums
Gin Wigmore albums
Albums produced by Mike Elizondo